Arthur Warren "Dutch" Elston (November 19, 1918 – September 10, 1989) was an American football center.

Elston was born in Texas in 1918 and attended Morrison R. Waite High School in Toledo, Ohio. He played college football at South Carolina. He served in the Army Air Corps during World War II.

He played professional football in the National Football League for the Cleveland Rams in 1945 and in the All-America Football Conference for the New York Yankees from 1946 to 1947. He appeared in 45 professional football games, 22 of them as a starter. 

After his playing career ended, Elston coached high school football in San Francisco. He was also the head football coach at City College of San Francisco (CCSF) from 1962 to 1977. His players at CCSF included O. J. Simpson.

He died of cancer in 1989 in San Francisco.

References

1918 births
1989 deaths
American football centers
Cleveland Rams players
San Francisco 49ers players
South Carolina Gamecocks football players
Players of American football from Texas
United States Army Air Forces personnel of World War II
Deaths from cancer in California